Gandaki Province or Gandaki Pradesh is one of the seven federal provinces of Nepal established by the country's new constitution of 20 September 2015, comprising eleven districts, namely, Baglung, Gorkha, Kaski, Lamjung, Manang, Mustang, Myagdi, Nawalpur, Parbat, Syangja and Tanahun. This province is formerly known as Province No. 4. There are many categorized monument sites in Gandaki Province. Here is district wise List of Monuments which is in the Gandaki Province.

Lists per district of Gandaki Province 
 List of monuments in Baglung District
 List of monuments in Gorkha District
 List of monuments in Kaski District
 List of monuments in Lamjung District
 List of monuments in Manang District
 List of monuments in Mustang District
 List of monuments in Myagdi District
 List of monuments in Nawalpur District (see list of monuments in the former Nawalparasi District)
 List of monuments in Parbat District
 List of monuments in Syangja District
 List of monuments in Tanahun District

References 

Gandaki Province

Tourist attractions in Gandaki Province